European U22 Beach Volleyball Championships is a double-gender beach volleyball tournament for national U22 teams. It is organised annually by the European Volleyball Confederation (CEV). First held in 1999, it was originally an under-23 tournament until 2013 when it was restricted to athletes under the age of 22.

Men's tournament

Results summary

Notes:

Women's tournament

Results summary

Notes:

Medal table

References

External links
European Volleyball Confederation

Beach volleyball competitions
European Beach Volleyball Championships
European volleyball records and statistics
Volleyball Beach
Youth volleyball